Strahinja Stefanović (born 7 March 1998) is a Serbian sprint canoeist. He won a silver medal at the 2019 World Championships in K-1 200 m.

References

1998 births
Living people
ICF Canoe Sprint World Championships medalists in kayak
Serbian male canoeists
Sportspeople from Novi Sad
Olympic canoeists of Serbia
Canoeists at the 2020 Summer Olympics